Havilah ( Ḥăwīlāh) refers to both a land and people in several books of the Bible; the one mentioned in , while the other is mentioned in .

Biblical mentions
In one case, Havilah is associated with the Garden of Eden, that mentioned in the Book of Genesis (2:10-11):

In addition to the region described in chapter 2 of Genesis, two individuals named Havilah are listed in the Table of Nations. The Table lists the descendants of Noah, who are considered eponymous ancestors of nations. One person is the son of Cush, the son of Ham. The other person is a son of Joktan and descendant of Shem.

One passage mentions Israelites being sent to Assyria and Halah. According to the monk Antoine Augustin Calmet, Halah most likely indicates Havilah.

Extra-biblical mentions
In extra-biblical literature, the land of Havilah is mentioned in Pseudo-Philo as the source of the precious jewels that the Amorites used in fashioning their idols in the days after Joshua, when Kenaz was judge over the Israelites.

There is an extra-biblical tradition found in the Kitab al-Magall (Clementine literature) and the Cave of Treasures. According to this tale, in the early days after the Tower of Babel, the children of Havilah, son of Joktan built a city and kingdom, which was near to those of his brothers, Sheba and Ophir.

Possible location

W.F. Albright, in the 1922 publication The Location Of The Garden Of Eden, states that "the Havilah of Genesis, chapter 2, refers certainly to the African Havilah, rather than to the Asiatic Havilah which lay opposite, since it is said to produce good gold, gum resin, and malachite, all of which 
are important products of the Nubian Desert, and two of which, at least, do not seem to have been found in western Arabia." 

Albright goes on further to illustrate that: "Genesis chapter 10 gives the name "Havilah" twice, once in verse 7, among the sons of Kush (Ethiopia) after Seba, and the second time in verse [29], among the sons of Joktan, immediately after Sheba and Ophir. There is no reason to suppose, as is popular nowadays, that the sections came from different hands; we have rather an unskilful attempt to state the fact that there were two divisions of the tribes, one African, the other Asiatic." 

The Havilah (or Hawilah in Hebrew) which Albright is referencing is Hawila, Sudan, a place found in the Khartoum region of the country.

W. W. Müller, in the 1992 Anchor Bible Dictionary, holds that the "Havilah" of Genesis 2 must refer to a region in southwest Arabia. He locates the reference to a "Havilah" in Genesis 25:18 as referring to a northern Arabian location.

Saadia Gaon's tenth-century Arabic translation of the Hebrew Bible substitutes Havilah with Zeila in present day Somaliland. Benjamin Tudela, the twelfth-century Jewish traveler, claimed Zeila was the land of Havilah confined by Al-Habash on the west. Zeila (Havilah) had been sacked by the Portuguese governor of Old Goa, Lopo Soares de Albergaria, while its Harla chief Mahfuz invaded Abyssinia in 1517.

In 1844, Charles Forster argued that a trace of the ancient name Havilah could still be found in the use of Aval for what is now known as Bahrain Island.

Augustus Henry Keane believed that the land of Havilah was centered on Great Zimbabwe and was roughly contemporaneous with what was then Southern Rhodesia. Havilah Camp was the name of the base camp of a group of British archaeologists who studied the Great Zimbabwe ruins from 1902 to 1904. In the end, they rejected any biblical connection with the settlement.

Sir Walter Raleigh appears to identify Havilah with Tibet.

References 

Amorites
Book of Genesis people
Books of Chronicles people
Books of Samuel
Hebrew Bible places
Horn of Africa